Local feature size refers to several related concepts in computer graphics and computational geometry for measuring the size of a geometric object near a particular point.  

See also
Nearest neighbour function

References 

Geometric algorithms